Tremors is the debut studio album by English musician Sohn, released on 7 April 2014 by 4AD. In 2014 it was awarded a silver certification from the Independent Music Companies Association, which indicated sales of at least 20,000 copies throughout Europe.

Track listing

Personnel
Credits adapted from the liner notes of Tremors.

 Sohn – additional mixing, production ; mixing ; design, layout
 Carla Fernández Andrade – front and back photography
 Alex 'Lexx' Dromgoole – mixing 
 Stefan 'Woody' Fallman – bass guitar 
 Alison Fielding – design, layout
 Albin Janoska – mixing ; additional synths 
 Dan Perry – mixing 
 Two Inch Punch – additional production 
 Andreas Waldschuetz – portrait photography

Charts

References

2014 debut albums
Sohn (musician) albums
4AD albums